Rodney Martineau "Rod" Burstall FRSE (born 1934) is a British computer scientist and one of four founders of the Laboratory for Foundations of Computer Science at the University of Edinburgh.

Biography
Burstall studied physics at the University of Cambridge, then an M.Sc. in operational research at Birmingham University. He worked for three years before returning to Birmingham University to earn a Ph.D. in 1966 with thesis titled Heuristic and Decision Tree Methods on Computers: Some Operational Research Applications under the supervision of N. A. Dudley and K. B. Haley.

Burstall was an early and influential proponent of functional programming, pattern matching, and list comprehension, and is known for his work with Robin Popplestone on POP, an innovative programming language developed at Edinburgh around 1970, and later work with John Darlington on NPL and program transformation and with David MacQueen and Don Sannella on Hope, a precursor to Standard ML, Miranda, and Haskell.

In 1995, he was elected a Fellow of the Royal Society of Edinburgh.

Burstall retired in 2000, becoming Professor Emeritus.

In 2002 David Rydeheard and Don Sannella assembled a festschrift for Rod Burstall that was published in Formal Aspects of Computing.

In 2009, he was awarded the ACM SIGPLAN Programming Language Achievement Award.

Books
 May 1971: Programming in POP-11, Edinburgh University Press.
 1980: (with Alan Bundy) Artificial Intelligence: An Introductory Course, Edinburgh University Press.
 1988: (with D. E. Rydeheard) Computational Category Theory, Prentice-Hall, .

References

External links
 University of Edinburgh home page
 Rod Burstall Home Page
 

1934 births
Living people
Scientists from Liverpool
British computer scientists
Formal methods people
History of computing in the United Kingdom
Academics of the University of Edinburgh
Alumni of the University of Cambridge
Alumni of the University of Birmingham